Isaac Bullard may refer to:

Isaac Bullard (Vermont religious leader), a 19th-century Pentecostal religious leader
Isaac Bullard (Massachusetts politician), a representative to the Great and General Court